Naina Ganguly (born 17 April 1994) is an Indian actress who appears in Telugu films. She is known for her role in Meri Beti Sunny Leone Banna Chaahti Hai (2017) and Charitraheen (2018 web series).

Filmography

References

External links

 
 

Living people
Actresses in Telugu cinema
1994 births

Actresses from Kolkata
Bengali actresses
Indian film actresses
Indian actresses
21st-century Indian actresses